This is a list of mosques in Scotland

See also
 Islam in the United Kingdom

External links 
 Directory of Mosques in the UK

 
Scotland
Mosques